NHS Resolution, the operating name of NHS Litigation Authority, is an arm's length body of the Department of Health and Social Care.  It changed its name in April 2017.

The organisation's purpose is to provide expertise to the NHS on resolving concerns fairly, share learning for improvement and preserve resources for patient care.

Services
NHS Resolution's strategic plan Delivering fair resolution and learning from harm, published in 2017 and updated in 2019, outlined a shift in emphasis away from predominantly claim management to proactive, earlier interventions to support families and staff.

The services provided include:

 Claims management, for clinical and non-clinical claims
 A tribunal service for primary care contracting disputes
 Advice and support regarding concerns about the individual performance of doctors, dentists and pharmacists
 Support to the NHS to aid understanding of claims risk, to assist patient safety activity.

History
The NHS Litigation Authority was established in 1995 as a special health authority. Its current duties are established under the National Health Service Act 2006. It began using the name NHS Resolution in April 2017, reflecting a change of role to "the early settlement of cases, learning from what goes wrong and the prevention of errors" according to Jeremy Hunt, Secretary of State for Health.

Key people 
Martin Thomas, formerly vice-chairman of the Medical Protection Society, was appointed to a three-year term as chair of NHS Resolution in January 2021. Helen Vernon has been chief executive since 2014.

Dame Joan Higgins chaired the body from 2007 until she stepped down at the end of 2013. Ian Dilks held the post for two three-year terms, from 2014 to 2020.

References

External links
 

1995 establishments in the United Kingdom
Government agencies established in 1995
NHS special health authorities
NHS legislation
Law of negligence